Hopper Glacier is located in the US state of Montana.

References

See also
 List of glaciers in the United States

Glaciers of Carbon County, Montana
Glaciers of Montana